Southfield is a city in Oakland County in the U.S. state of Michigan. As of the 2020 census, the city had a population of 76,618.

As a northern suburb of Detroit, Southfield shares part of its southern border with Detroit. The city was originally part of Southfield Township before incorporating in 1958. The autonomous city of Lathrup Village is an enclave within Southfield. The city is home to the Southfield Town Center complex, which includes five connected office buildings.

History
Southfield was surveyed in 1817 according to the plan by Michigan territorial governor Lewis Cass. The first settlers came from nearby Birmingham and Royal Oak, Michigan, as well as New York and Vermont. The area that became Southfield was settled by John Daniels in 1823. Among the founders were the Heth, Stephens, Harmon, McClelland and Thompson families.

Town 1 north, 10 east was first organized as Ossewa Township on July 12, 1830, but the name was changed to Southfield Township 17 days later. The township took its name from its location in the "south fields" of Bloomfield Township. A US post office was established in 1833 and the first town hall built in 1873.

The Southfield Fire Department was formed on April 6, 1942, and the Southfield Police Department in 1953. In the 1950s, cities and villages began to incorporate within the township, including Lathrup Village in 1950, and Beverly Hills in 1957. Most of what was left of the township was formally incorporated as a city on April 28, 1958, to protect it from annexation attempts by Detroit; whites who had migrated to the suburbs did not want to be associated with Detroit's expanding black community.

City Hall was built in 1964 as part of the new Civic Center complex, which also became home to Southfield's police headquarters. The Civic Center was expanded in 1971 to include a sports arena with swimming pool. Evergreen Hills Golf Course was added in 1972, and in 1978, a new public safety building, the Southfield Pavilion, and a new court building were added. In 2003, an expanded and redesigned Southfield Public Library opened to the public on the Civic Center grounds, featuring state-of-the-art facilities. Outside the Civic Center complex, Southfield has municipal parks and recreation facilities, largely developed in the 1970s, including Beech Woods Recreation Center and John Grace Community Center.

Duns Scotus College is now the home of Word of Faith Christian Center.

Economy

Several internationally recognized corporations have major offices and headquarters in Southfield, including Veoneer, Huf Hülsbeck and Fürst, Denso, Peterson Spring, Federal-Mogul, Lear, R.L. Polk & Co., International Automotive Components, Stefanini, Inc., and Guardian Alarm. More than 100 Fortune 500 companies have offices in Southfield.

Sumitomo Corporation operates the Detroit Office in Suite 1450 at 27777 Franklin Road. Industries supported by the office include automotive, rolled steel, and tubular products.

On October 28, 2014, Fifth Third Bank announced plans to move its Michigan regional headquarters from Southfield to downtown Detroit in what will be named the Fifth Third Bank Building at One Woodward. The office had 150 employees.

Northland Center, one of the nation's first shopping malls, opened in Southfield in 1954 and closed in 2015. As of 2022, the property is being redeveloped as a mixed-use residential and commercial complex.

Southfield City Centre 
Prominent in Southfield is Southfield City Centre, a mixed-use area consisting of a major business center, private university, and residential neighborhoods, near the intersection of Interstate 696 (I-696, Walter P. Reuther Freeway) and the M-10 (Lodge Freeway).

Southfield City Centre was created in 1992 as a special assessment district, and was originally planned to improve pedestrian amenities and facilitate economic development.

Diplomatic missions
The Consulate of Macedonia in Detroit is in the Southfield Town Center, and the Consulate of Iraq in Detroit is in Southfield.

Conventions
Penguicon has been held in Southfield regularly since 2014.

Geography

The main branch of the River Rouge runs through Southfield. The city is bounded to the south by Eight Mile Road, its western border is Inkster Road, and to the east it is bounded by Greenfield Road. Southfield's northern border does not follow a single road, but lies approximately along Thirteen Mile Road. The city is bordered by Detroit and Redford Township to the south, Farmington Hills to the west, Franklin, Bingham Farms, and Beverly Hills to the north and Royal Oak, Berkley and Oak Park to the east. The separate city of Lathrup Village sits as an enclave in the eastern part of the city, completely surrounded by Southfield.

Demographics

2020 Census

2010 census
As of the census of 2010, there were 71,739 people, 31,778 households, and 18,178 families residing in the city. The racial makeup of the city was 70.3% African American, 24.9% White, 0.2% Native American, 1.7% Asian, 0.4% from other races, and 2.4% from two or more races. Hispanic or Latino of any race were 1.3% of the population.

There were 31,778 households, of which 26.7% had children under the age of 18 living with them, 33.5% were married couples living together, 19.4% had a female householder with no husband present, 4.4% had a male householder with no wife present, and 42.8% were non-families. 37.9% of all households were made up of individuals, and 13.7% had someone living alone who was 65 years of age or older. The average household size was 2.22 and the average family size was 2.96.

The median age in the city was 42. 20.5% of residents were under the age of 18; 8.5% were between the ages of 18 and 24; 24.7% were from 25 to 44; 29.2% were from 45 to 64; and 16.9% were 65 years of age or older. The gender makeup of the city was 44.7% male and 55.3% female.

2000 census
As of the census of 2000, there were 78,296 people, 33,987 households, and 19,780 families residing in the city. The racial makeup of the city was 54.22% African American, 38.83% White, 3.09% Asian, 0.20% Native American, 0.03% Pacific Islander, 0.64% from other races, and 2.99% from two or more races. 1.19% of the population were Hispanic or Latino of any race.

Of the city's 33,987 households, 25.3% had children under the age of 18 living with them, 40.2% were married couples living together, 14.3% had a female householder with no husband present, and 41.8% were non-families. 36.2% of all households were made up of individuals, and 11.9% had someone living alone who was 65 years of age or older. The average household size was 2.27 and the average family size was 3.01.

The age distribution in the city's population was spread out, with 21.6% under the age of 18, 7.9% from 18 to 24, 30.6% from 25 to 44, 24.8% from 45 to 64, and 15.2% who were 65 years of age or older. The median age was 38. For every 100 females there were 84.9 males. For every 100 females age 18 and over, there were 80.9 males.

The median income for a household in the city was $51,802, and the median income for a family was $64,543. Males had a median income of $48,341 versus $37,949 for females. The per capita income for the city was $28,096. About 5.8% of families and 7.4% of the population were below the poverty line, including 8.2% of those under age 18 and 10.2% of those age 65 or over.

Socioeconomic status
The most common occupations for people in Southfield are a mix of both white- and blue-collar jobs. Overall, Southfield is a city of sales and office workers, professionals and managers. A relatively large number of people living in Southfield work in office and administrative support (16.00%), sales jobs (10.93%), and management occupations (9.72%). Southfield's populace is very well-educated relative to most cities and towns in the nation. Whereas 21.84% of the average community's adult population holds a 4-year degree or higher, 38.73% of Southfield's adults have a bachelor's degree or advanced degree. Southfield's per capita income in 2010 was $28,995.

Ethnic groups

African Americans

In 2002 Southfield had 42,259 black people, the second-largest black population in Metro Detroit and third-largest in Michigan.

As of 2011, many African Americans from Detroit were moving into Southfield and other suburbs of Oakland and Macomb counties. Tensions have occurred between existing middle-class blacks in Southfield and newcomers from Wayne County.

Chaldean Catholic Assyrians

As of 2001 many Chaldo-Assyrians live in Southfield; they are descended from the ancient Nineveh region of the Assyrian homeland in North Iraq. The Chaldean Federation of America, an umbrella organization for most regional Chaldean groups, is in Southfield. As of that year, the largest Chaldean church, by number of congregants, was based here. The city also had the area's sole Chaldean retirement home.

Government
Southfield uses the council-manager form of government, and thus is governed by a City Council consisting of seven council members. The city council appoints a City Administrator, who manages the day-to-day operations of the city. The popularly elected mayor, who does not vote on council actions, has the right to veto council actions and appoints the city's planner, assessor, attorney, and members of various commissions. The city's clerk and treasurer are also popularly elected officials. All these officials hold nonpartisan positions.

 City officials
Mayor Kenson Siver (term expires November 2021)
 City Council
Council President Linnie Taylor (term expires November 2025)
Council President Pro Tem Michael "Ari" Mandelbaum (term expires November 2023)
Council Member Nancy Banks (term expires November 2023)
Council Member Daniel Brightwell (term expires November 2023)
Council Member Lloyd C. Crews (term expires November 2025)
Council Member Myron Frasier (term expires November 2023)
Council Member Jason Hoskins (term expires November 2025)
 Other elected officials 
City Clerk Sherika L. Hawkins (term expires November 2025)
City Treasurer Irv M. Lowenberg (term expires November 2025)
State officials
Governor Gretchen Whitmer (D)
State Senator Jeremy Moss (D) – 14th State Senate District
State Representative Kyra Bolden (D) – 35th State House District
Federal officials
Senator Gary C. Peters (D)
Senator Debbie Stabenow (D)
Representative Brenda Lawrence (D) – 14th Congressional District

Education
Southfield Public Schools operates area public schools. Southfield Senior High School for the Arts and Technology (commonly known as Southfield A&T) is the district's sole high school. There were originally two high schools in the district, Southfield and Southfield-Lathrup, but they were consolidated after the 2015–16 school year. Students living in parts of Northern Southfield attend schools in the Birmingham City School District, while students living in the southeast corner of Southfield attend schools in the Oak Park School District. Southfield A&T also competes in the Oakland Activities Association in the Red Division for high school sports, and has membership in the MHSAA.

AGBU Alex and Marie Manoogian School is an Armenian charter in Southfield.

Farber Hebrew Day School – Yeshivat Akiva is a private Jewish school in Southfield.

Southfield Christian School is a private school in Southfield.

Southfield Public Library operates public libraries in the city.Providence Medical Center offers residency training in various fields of medicine.

Colleges and universities 
Southfield is home to eight colleges, including Lawrence Technological University, Abcott Institute, Everest Institute and Oakland Community College. The Specs Howard School of Media Arts is in Southfield.

Media

Southfield is the broadcast media center for the Detroit area, with studios and broadcast facilities for several television stations, including WXYZ-TV, WJBK, WKBD-TV, WMYD-TV, WWJ-TV, and City Cable 15. Metro Detroit's regional sports network Bally Sports Detroit is in Southfield on 11 Mile and Evergreen roads. A transmitter for WDIV-TV is in the city; it is the only television station based in downtown Detroit.

The city is home to Audacy’s Detroit studios. Southfield is also served by WSHJ 88.3 FM, a student-run radio station sponsored by Southfield Public Schools.

In 1970, radio pioneer and entertainer Specs Howard founded the Specs Howard School of Media Arts in Southfield.

In addition to The Detroit News and Free Press, Detroit's two metropolitan daily newspapers, Southfield is served by the Southfield Eccentric, a suburban paper that reports on local and community events, which is published twice a week, on Sunday and Thursday. The headquarters of The Detroit Jewish News is in Southfield. The Chaldean News is also headquartered in Southfield.

Transportation

Suburban Mobility Authority for Regional Transportation (SMART) operates local and regional bus transit.

The major thoroughfares in the city include the John C. Lodge Freeway (M-10), which is among the first urban to suburban highways constructed in the United States. The city also contains I-696, Southfield Freeway (M-39), and US 24 (Telegraph Road). The city has several freeway interchanges connecting local roads to the freeways. Most prominently, "The Lodge" freeway connects downtown Detroit to "The Mixing Bowl," the sprawling interchange of I-696, US 24, M-10, Lahser Road, and Franklin Road, all of which are in Southfield.

Most major streets adhere to a north–south/east–west orientation, forming a grid of major streets spaced one mile (1.6 km) apart from each other. The major east–west streets are 8 Mile Road (which forms the southern boundary of the city), 9 Mile Road (which is split by the Southfield Freeway), 10 Mile Road, 11 Mile Road (which is split by the Lodge), and 12 Mile Road. Major north–south streets are Telegraph Road, Lahser Road, Evergreen Road, Southfield Road (the northern extension of the Southfield Freeway) and Greenfield Road (which forms the eastern boundary of the city).

Religion
The Roman Catholic Archdiocese of Detroit formerly operated the Church of St. Bede. By 2013 there was a debate on how the property should be rezoned, and therefore reused.

Parks and recreation

The Southfield Parks and Recreation Department is responsible for 775 acres of parks, nature preserves and open space and historic properties at 33 sites within the city. There are numerous ball fields, tennis and handball courts, picnic areas and shelters. There are soccer fields, play lots and sand volleyball courts throughout the city.

 Bauervic Woods Park 
 Bedford Woods Park 
 Beech Woods Park
 Brace Park
 Burgh Historical Park
 Carpenter Lake Nature Preserve 
 Civic Center Park
 Freeway Park
 Inglenook Park
 John Grace Park & Community Center
 John R. Miller Park
 Lahser Woods Park
 Lincoln Woods
 Mary Thompson House & Farm
 Pebble Creek Park
 Simms Park
 Stratford Woods Commons
 Valley Woods Nature Preserve

Notable people

 Jay Adelson, entrepreneur
 Ingrid Andress, country singer-songwriter (born in Southfield, Michigan)
 Johnathon Banks, boxer
 Jeff Blashill, professional ice hockey head coach
 Selma Blair, actress
 Harry J. Brooks (1902-1927), test pilot
 Jimmy Carson, professional hockey player
 Mike Chappell, professional basketball player
 Elijah Connor, singer
 Billy Davis, musician currently living in Southfield
 Erin Dilly, actress raised in Southfield
 Glenn Earl, professional football player
 Geoffrey Fieger, attorney for Jack Kevorkian based in Southfield
 Susie Garrett (1929-2002), actress
 Chris Getz, professional baseball player
 Nicole Gibbons, TV personality
 Dan Gilbert, businessman raised in Southfield
 Jon Glaser, actor raised in Southfield
 GRiZ, American DJ and electronic producer
 Yasmine Hanani, actress
 Carla Harvey, musician
 Thomas Hearns, retired boxer living in Southfield
 John James, politician 
 I Prevail, metal band from Southfield
 Ben Kelso, professional basketball player
 Keegan-Michael Key, actor
 Byron Krieger (1920-2015), Olympic fencer
 Tony Leech, director, screenwriter, editor
 Eric Lefkofsky, businessman
 Raynetta Mañees, novelist, entertainer
 Devyn Marble (born 1992), basketball player for Maccabi Haifa of the Israeli Basketball Premier League
 Howard Markel, medical historian
 Roya Megnot (1962-2009), actress
 Jeremy Moss, politician
 Colette Nelson, body builder
 Chukwuma Okorafor, professional football player
 Lawrence Payton (1938-1997), musician
 Matt Pike, musician
 Steven Pitt (1959-2018), American forensic psychiatrist
 Mike Posner, singer-songwriter
 Bill Prady, television writer raised in Southfield
 Emily Samuelson, ice dancer
 Debbie Schlussel, film critic
 Jay Sebring (1933-1969), celebrity hair stylist and victim of the Manson Family
 Jason Stollsteimer, musician
 Jennifer Laura Thompson, actress
 Malaya Watson, singer
 Rick Worthy, actor
 Sheldon Yellen, entrepreneur

See also

Architecture of metropolitan Detroit
Lawrence Technological University
Metro Detroit
Tourism in metropolitan Detroit
History of the African-Americans in Metro Detroit
Specs Howard School of Media Arts

References

External links

City of Southfield
Southfield Area Chamber of Commerce

 
Cities in Oakland County, Michigan
Metro Detroit
Populated places established in 1823
1823 establishments in Michigan Territory